Charles Lewis may refer to:

Sportspeople
Charles Lewis (cyclist) (born 1968), Belizean cyclist
Charles Lewis (footballer) (1886–1967), English football player
Charles Lewis (rugby union) (1853–1923), Welsh rugby international
Charles Lewis (sculler) (died 1863), winner of the Wingfield Sculls in 1831 and 1833
Charles B. Lewis, American football coach
Charles L. Lewis (American football), head college football coach for the Tuskegee University Golden Tigers
Charlie Lewis (1907–1972), American baseball player

Politicians
Charles Lewis (Australian politician) (1870–1935), Australian politician
Charles Lewis (New Zealand politician) (1857–1927), New Zealand politician
Charles Lewis (South African politician), mayor of Cape Town
Charles G. Lewis (1823–?), American politician in Wisconsin
Charles H. Lewis (1871–1965), American politician in Ohio
Charles Hance Lewis (1816–?), American diplomat from Virginia, United States Ambassador to Portugal, 1870–1875
Charles L. Lewis (California politician) (1966–2004), San Diego city council member
Charles Lundy Lewis (1852–1936), American judge, justice of the Minnesota Supreme Court
Charles S. Lewis (1821–1878), U.S. Representative from Virginia
Sir Charles Lewis, 1st Baronet (1825–1893), Member of Parliament for Londonderry City, 1872–1886, and North Antrim, 1887–1892
Jerry Lewis (California politician) (Charles Jeremy Lewis, born 1934), U.S. Representative from California

Military
Charles Lewis (soldier) (1733–1774), Virginian colonel killed in the Battle of Point Pleasant, namesake of Lewis County, West Virginia
Charles Algernon Lewis (1807–1904), British Army officer
Charles Lewis, African-American veteran lynched on December 16, 1918

Artists
Charles Lewis (painter) (1753–1795), English still life painter
Charles Lewis Jr. (1963–2009), co-founder of Tapout clothing
Charles Bertrand Lewis (1842–1924), American humorist also known as M. Quad
Charles D. Lewis (born 1955), Barbadian musician
Charles George Lewis (1808–1880), English engraver
Charles James Lewis (1830–1892), English painter

Other
Charles Lewis (bookbinder) (1786–1836), English bookbinder
Charles Lewis (journalist) (born 1953), founder of the Center for Public Integrity
Charles Lewis (priest), Welsh Anglican priest
Charles Lilburn Lewis (1747–1831), Virginia pioneer

See also
Charles Louis (disambiguation)